The 1976–77 NBA season was the Bucks' ninth season in the NBA. It was also the first without Jon McGlocklin, the last remaining member of the Bucks' roster from the team's inaugural season.

Draft picks

Roster

Regular season

The Milwaukee Bucks rebuild in the wake of the trade of Kareem Abdul Jabbar to the Lakers following the 1974-75 NBA season hit bottom in 1976.  Head Coach Larry Costello resigned following a 3-15 start.  Assistant Coach Don Nelson took over the team but the Bucks slide continued as they eventually fell to 4-25.  The Bucks turned things around as the young nucleus began to gel and the Bucks went 26-27 the rest of the way.

Season standings

z – clinched division title
y – clinched division title
x – clinched playoff spot

Record vs. opponents

Game log

|-style="background:#fcc;"
| 1 || October 21, 1976 || Buffalo
| L 112–133
|
|
|
| MECCA Arena
| 0–1
|-style="background:#fcc;"
| 2 || October 23, 1976 || Boston
| L 107–111 OT
|
|
|
| MECCA Arena
| 0–2
|-style="background:#fcc;"
| 3 || October 24, 1976 || @ Atlanta
| L 91–115
|
|
|
| Omni Coliseum
| 0-3
|-style="background:#fcc;"
| 4 || October 26, 1976 || @ Chicago
| L 88–90
|
|
|
| Chicago Stadium
| 0-4
|-style="background:#fcc;"
| 5 || October 28, 1976 || @ Denver
| L 100–119
|
|
|
| McNichols Sports Arena
| 0-5
|-style="background:#bbffbb;"
| 6 || October 30, 1976 || Chicago
| W 102–74
|
|
|
| MECCA Arena
| 1–5

|-style="background:#bbffbb;"
| 7 || November 2, 1976 || Seattle
| W 125–113
|
|
|
| MECCA Arena
| 2–5
|-style="background:#fcc;"
| 8 || November 3, 1976 || @ Washington
| L 105–117
|
|
|
| Capital Centre
| 2-6
|-style="background:#fcc;"
| 9 || November 4, 1976 || @ Cleveland
| L 88–96
|
|
|
| Coliseum at Richfield
| 2-7
|-style="background:#fcc;"
| 10 || November 6, 1976 || Denver
| L 103–105
|
|
|
| MECCA Arena
| 2–8
|-style="background:#fcc;"
| 11 || November 9, 1976 || Cleveland
| L 90–111
|
|
|
| MECCA Arena
| 2–9
|-style="background:#bbffbb;"
| 12 || November 12, 1976 || Houston
| W 111–99
|
|
|
| MECCA Arena
| 3–9
|-style="background:#fcc;"
| 13 || November 13, 1976 || N. Y. Knicks
| L 97–110
|
|
|
| Madison Square Garden
| 3–10
|-style="background:#fcc;"
| 14 || November 14, 1976 || Detroit
| L 84–104
|
|
|
| MECCA Arena
| 3–11

Player statistics

Transactions

Trades

References

Milwaukee Bucks seasons
Milwaukee
Milwau
Milwau